Kentucky's 10th congressional district was a district of the United States House of Representatives in Kentucky. It was lost to redistricting in 1933. Its last Representative was Andrew J. May.

List of members representing the district

References

 Congressional Biographical Directory of the United States 1774–present

10
Former congressional districts of the United States
1813 establishments in Kentucky
Constituencies established in 1813
Constituencies disestablished in 1933
1933 disestablishments in Kentucky